The Australian Plate is a major tectonic plate in the eastern and, largely, southern hemispheres. Originally a part of the ancient continent of Gondwana, Australia remained connected to India and Antarctica until approximately  when India broke away and began moving north.

The Australian plate later fused with the adjacent Indian Plate beneath the Indian Ocean to form a single Indo-Australian Plate. However, recent studies suggest that the two plates have once again split apart and have been separate plates for at least 3 million years and likely longer. The Australian Plate includes the continent of Australia, including Tasmania, as well as portions of New Guinea, New Zealand and the Indian Ocean basin.

Scope
The continental crust of this plate covers the whole of Australia, the Gulf of Carpentaria, southern New Guinea, the Arafura Sea, the Coral Sea. The continental crust also includes northwestern New Zealand, New Caledonia and Fiji. The oceanic crust includes the southeast Indian Ocean, the Tasman Sea, and the Timor Sea]. The Australian Plate is bordered (clockwise) by the Eurasian Plate, the Philippine Plate, the Pacific Plate, the Antarctic Plate, the African Plate and the Indian Plate.

Geography
The northeasterly side is a complex but generally convergent boundary with the Pacific Plate. The Pacific Plate is subducting under the Australian Plate, which forms the Tonga and Kermadec Trenches, and the parallel Tonga and Kermadec island arcs. It has also uplifted the eastern parts of New Zealand's North Island.

The continent of Zealandia, which separated from Australia 85 million years ago and stretches from New Caledonia in the north to New Zealand's subantarctic islands in the south, is now being torn apart along the transform boundary marked by the Alpine Fault.

South of New Zealand the boundary becomes a transitional transform-convergent boundary, the Macquarie Fault Zone, where the Australian Plate is beginning to subduct under the Pacific Plate along the Puysegur Trench. Extending southwest of this trench is the Macquarie Ridge.

The southerly side is a divergent boundary with the Antarctic Plate called the Southeast Indian Ridge (SEIR).

The subducting boundary through Indonesia is not parallel to the biogeographical Wallace line that separates the indigenous fauna of Asia from that of Australasia. The eastern islands of Indonesia lie mainly on the Eurasian Plate, but have Australasian-related fauna and flora. Southeasterly lies the Sunda Shelf.

Origins 

Speed
Australian Plate, which Australia is on, is moving faster than other plates. The Australian Plate is moving about 6.858 cm (2.7 inches) a year in a northward direction and with a small clockwise rotation. The Global Positioning System must be updated due to the movement, as some locations move faster.

See also
 List of earthquakes in Australia
 List of earthquakes in India
 List of earthquakes in Indonesia
 List of earthquakes in New Zealand
 List of earthquakes in Papua New Guinea
 List of earthquakes in Samoa
 List of earthquakes in Tonga
 List of earthquakes in Vanuatu

References

Tectonic plates
Natural history of Oceania
Plates
Plates